Kusum Forest Park is a forest park in the Gambia. Established on January 1, 1954, it covers 316 hectares.

It is located in the east of the country, in the Upper River Region in the Kantora district. To the west of the area is Garowol and to the east the area is bounded by the Gambia River.

References
  
 

Protected areas established in 1954
Forest parks of the Gambia